Liocrobyla saturata is a moth of the family Gracillariidae. It is known from Guadalcanal in the Solomon Islands.

References

Gracillariinae
Moths described in 1961